Samuel W. Roper (April 10, 1895 – March 1, 1986) was an American law enforcement official and Imperial Wizard of the Ku Klux Klan (KKK).

Roper was an Atlanta, Georgia police officer and the second Director of the Georgia Bureau of Investigation. After leaving law enforcement in 1949, Roper succeeded Samuel Green as Imperial Wizard of the KKK, and held that position until 1950. His successor was Eldon Edwards.  He has also been directly implicated in the September 12, 1936 lynching and murder of Thomas Finch in Atlanta, Georgia.   

Roper moved to Florida in 1972 and was a resident of Chiefland, Florida at the time of his death. He died of kidney failure at the Veterans Administration Hospital in Gainesville, Florida on March 1, 1986.

References

External links
Wall of Wizards  via Ku Klux Klan

1895 births
1986 deaths
Leaders of the Ku Klux Klan
Deaths from kidney failure
Atlanta Police Department officers
Ku Klux Klan in Georgia (U.S. state)
Activists from Atlanta
American Ku Klux Klan members